Csernely is a village in Borsod-Abaúj-Zemplén county, Hungary. The roads leading through the village connect with Csokvaomány, Lénárddaróc and Bükkmogyorósd. The nearest town is Ózd (11 km).

In the 19th and 20th centuries, a small Jewish community lived in the village, in 1880 25 Jews lived in the village, most of whom were murdered in the Holocaust. The community had a Jewish cemetery.

References

External links 
 Street map 

Populated places in Borsod-Abaúj-Zemplén County